The Lynn Building is a Victorian structure in Belfast, Northern Ireland, United Kingdom. It was designed in the Ruskinian Gothic style by the British architect William Henry Lynn, after whom it is now named. It was completed in 1868. A part of Queen's University Belfast, it was originally built as the institution's library, but today houses the graduate school.

History
Queen's College, Belfast was chartered in 1845 as one of three constituent colleges of the Queen's University of Ireland. Initially having just 23 professors and 195 students, the college could be housed entirely within the main Lanyon Building. Initially the examinations hall (now known as the Great Hall) inside the Lanyon Building served additionally as the library. However expansion of the institution meant that by the 1860s a discrete building was needed to house the college's growing library. The architect William Henry Lynn was duly commissioned to design the structure.

The continued growth of Queen's University of Belfast (as it had become in 1908 as a result of the Irish Universities Act) saw the need to expand the library further. Anonymously entering the competition to design the expansion, WH Lynn won the tender to augment his initial building. With construction undertaken between 1912 and 1914 it was one of his last projects (Lynn died in 1915).

Alterations were carried out in the 1950s, at which time the poet Philip Larkin – who worked as a sub-librarian for the university between 1950 and 1955 – described the building as a ’perfect little paradise of a library’. Further alterations were made in the 1980s. The Lynn Building was closed in 2009, following the opening of the McClay Library. It was restored in 2015, at which point it was also adapted for use as the graduate school.

Architecture
 
Unlike the university's Tudor Revival Lanyon Building, the Lynn Building is in the High Victorian Gothic style which was prominent during the mid-nineteenth century. It features numerous examples of the form of Neo-Gothic championed by the critic John Ruskin, including polychrome (the roof tiling and brickwork), varying materials (window tracery, bases and columns of different stone types set into polychromatic brickwork), and detailing (gargoyles).

Anatomically, the structure is noted for its large number of rose windows, engaged buttresses (both setback and diagonal), and side-gables.

See also

 Architecture of Belfast Buildings and structures in Belfast

References

1868 establishments in Ireland
Buildings and structures completed in 1868
Buildings and structures in Belfast
Libraries in Northern Ireland
Former library buildings of the United Kingdom
Gothic Revival architecture in Northern Ireland
Queen's University Belfast
19th-century architecture in Northern Ireland